The Lingnan University Library was named after the late benefactor Mr. Fong Sum Wood in 1998. The Library is centrally located on the campus of Lingnan University, Hong Kong.

Since its beginning in 1968, the Library has grown to hold more than 530,000 volumes of books, bound journals and audio-visual materials. The core collections cover various areas of the liberal arts curriculum, including arts and humanities, social sciences, and business studies. In order to keep up with the speedy pace of technology advancement, the Library has introduced a wide range of electronic services, such as online full-text databases, CD-ROMs, wireless LAN and different types of automatic alert services. The Chiang Chen Information Commons (IC) in the Library also provides the Lingnan community a one-stop service for reference, information technology and multimedia services support.
The Library is located in the Main Building of the Lingnan campus and occupies four floors. It provides over 160 public PCs and more than 600 seats for Library users. The Library is not only a place for studying and researching, but also a place for relaxing and networking. Users can work on their group projects in the individual and collaborative workrooms in the IC on 1/F; or enjoy soft drinks and watch current news from the TV provided inside the Café for a break during study.

The Library has 38 full-time staff at present, in which 11 of them are professional staff. The average opening hours per week are 93 hours.

Timeline
 1967 Original Library, located in Stubbs Road, Wan Chai
 1995 Current Library, located in Tuen Mun
 2005 Construction of 3/F and 4/F of the Library building completed
 2008 Renovation of 1/F and 2/F of the Library completed
 2009 Two large study rooms are established on the 3/F
 2011 Completion of LC Re-Classification Project
 2012 Lingnan University Archives Opening

Collections
Currently, more than 530,000 volumes of English and Chinese books are on open shelves on the first and third floors where students can access them freely. The strength of the book collection is on arts and humanities, business and management, and the social sciences. The Library also subscribes to over 270 online databases, approximately 69,000 electronic and 1,162 print journals on these academic disciplines. Journals are kept on the second floor and newspapers are kept on the 1/F Reading Room. More than 177,000 items of media resources, including audio and video tapes, Blu-ray discs, DVD, laser discs, multimedia packages, microforms, etc. are housed in the Multimedia and Language Learning Center on the same floor.

In addition, the Library established online databases such as Tuen Mun Heritage Image Database, Lingnan Newsletter, Lingnan Publications, Theses and Dissertations, Lingnan University Examination Database, etc.

Services
Services provided include Circulation Services, Information Services, User Education, and Interlibrary Loan Services. Besides, the Library has undertaken the Hong Kong Academic Library Link (HKALL) project since 2005. Users can request more than 11 million books from 8 academic libraries online for free.

Library Automation
The Library has been fully automated since 1994. Users can gain 24 hours access to databases and electronic resources through the Library website  and to other library systems. The Library also has a Wireless LAN network for internet access from personal laptop computers.

Cooperation & Collaboration
The Library has actively participated in cooperating and resource sharing with libraries in Hong Kong, mainland China, Taiwan and Macau. In 1993, it worked with the City University of Hong Kong Library to establish the Pearl River Delta Collection Project; in 1996, cooperated with all Hong Kong academic libraries on Chinese cataloging; in 1998, organized Joint Symposium on Library & Information Services; in 1999, spearheaded to establish Hong Kong Chinese Authority (Name) database (HKCAN); in 2000 & 2001, organized Summer Workshop and Summer Program respectively; in 2003 & 2005, organized Annual Hong Kong Innovative Users Group Meeting; in 2012, organized JULAC Libraries Forum.

YouTube Channel
The Library has set up a channel in YouTube providing videos on User Guides, Workshops, Talks and Seminars, and other special topics. An Online Library Guide is now available on YouTube including a full tour of the facilities.

References

Libraries in Hong Kong
Tuen Mun District
Library buildings completed in 1995
Libraries established in 1968